Derobrachus asperatus is a species of beetle in the family Cerambycidae. It was described by Bates in 1878.

References

Prioninae
Beetles described in 1878